Over to Candleford is a 1941 semi-autobiographical novel by the English author Flora Thompson. 

In 1945 the book was republished as part of the trilogy Lark Rise to Candleford, comprising the novels Lark Rise (1939), Over to Candleford (1941), and Candleford Green (1943).

Plot 
The novel follows the childhood of Laura Timmins in the small rural northern Oxfordshire hamlet of Lark Rise and the surrounding countryside. It is a study of her family and relatives in the nearby market town of Candleford (based chiefly on Buckingham).

Critical analysis 
Laura represents the author Flora Thompson herself, born Flora Timms. According to Richard Mabey in his 2014 book Dreams of the Good Life, in this novel Laura's role is subtly changing from sharp observer of village life to someone reflecting on the rites of passage to adulthood, a novelist in embryo.

See also 
 Lark Rise to Candleford, the trilogy of which this novel is a part.

References

Novels by Flora Thompson
1941 British novels
Novels set in Oxfordshire
Novels set in Buckinghamshire
 Oxford University Press books